Skyscraper is a musical that ran on Broadway in 1965 and 1966.  The book was written by Peter Stone, and the music by Jimmy Van Heusen with lyrics by Sammy Cahn.  Based on the 1945 Elmer Rice play Dream Girl, the Broadway production starred Julie Harris in her first musical.

Production

Skyscraper opened on Broadway at the Lunt-Fontanne Theatre on November 13, 1965 and closed on June 11, 1966 after 248 performances and 22 previews. The previews had begun in October.  The musical was directed by Cy Feuer and choreographed by Michael Kidd. Prior to Broadway, the show was performed September 13 through Oct 15, 1965 at the Fisher Theater in Detroit. The cast included Julie Harris, Peter Marshall, and Charles Nelson Reilly.

An original cast album was released by Capitol Records.

Plot overview

The story is of Georgina, an antiques dealer who is determined to save her midtown Manhattan brownstone from the bulldozer. The girders of a new skyscraper are stalking her, and she has been offered $165,000 for her Rutherford B. Hayes-era building. When she can manage to stay on track, Georgina is bright in her thinking and staunch in her beliefs. But far too often she strays into a Walter Mitty-like dream world full of funny fantasies with her effete shop assistant.

Songs

Act I      
 Occasional Flight of Fancy
 Run For Your Life
 Local 403
 Opposites
 Run For Your Life (Reprise)
 Just the Crust
 Everybody Has a Right to Be Wrong 
 Wrong!
 The Auction
 Occasional Flight of Fancy (Reprise)

Act II      
 The Gaiety
 More Than One Way
 Haute Couture
 Don't Worry
 I'll Only Miss Her When I Think of Her
 Spare That Building

Critical reception

The newspaper columnist Dorothy Kilgallen attended a preview performance—a benefit for charity—on October 21, 1965.  Despite a theater critics' tradition of refraining from reviewing preview performances of Broadway shows, Kilgallen expressed her opinion of Skyscraper in her column as it appeared in the New York Journal-American.  She wrote,I wish someone would pass a law making it illegal for a columnist to see a Broadway show before its official premiere.   Then we would all be spared the personality-splitting question:  to comment, or not to comment, when they still might be "fixing?"   Variety, and other papers, review shows the minute they rear their heads out of town, in any town, so it seems to me the divertissements are fair game when they come into my town and start playing previews to which people pay $50 a ticket for the privilege of sitting in the balcony.

I am referring, specifically, to "Skyscraper," which I saw -- saw the first act of, to be completely accurate -- at the Lunt-Fontanne Theatre last night, in homage to a worthy charity, the George Junior Republic, of which I am a patron.  The street outside the theatre was jammed with Rolls-Royces and Cadillacs, the playhouse was crammed with attractive and celebrated and polite people, but even the politest could not work up much enthusiasm for this new musical comedy.  It contains Julie Harris, quite inexplicably, since she is not a musical comedy performer, Charles Nelson Reilly, who does everything but set fire to his trousers to get laughs where none are written in the libretto, one marvelous construction company ballet in the first act which should open the show, but doesn't, no music to sing of, and a lot of costumes that imitate last year's Courreges.

I will be delighted -- but astonished -- if this one gets good reviews.

However, in the case of the George Junior Republic Benefit, the show was followed by the traditional glamorous supper party tossed by Lillian and Hubie Boscowitz at the Four Seasons, where the turkey served is far more enjoyable than that dished up at the Lunt-Fontanne.

The cast and crew of Skyscraper were angered by Kilgallen's comments.  So was veteran theatrical producer and director Howard Lindsay, who was not involved with Skyscraper.  Kilgallen wrote a follow-up column in which she acknowledged Lindsay's objections and she maintained that she had done nothing wrong.  She died two weeks later.  Though her column was syndicated throughout North America, newspaper editors outside of New York City often omitted portions of it.  Such was the case with everything she wrote about Skyscraper.  Only those who bought the New York Journal-American read it.

Skyscraper officially opened, five days after Kilgallen's death, to mixed reviews.  Despite stiff competition from Hello, Dolly!, Mame, Man of La Mancha, and Sweet Charity, the production ran for 248 performances and was nominated for five Tony Awards, including Best Musical and Best Actress in a Musical.

The New York Times reviewer wrote that Georgina's daydreams "have become broadly comic cartoons of romance, among the funniest moments in a brash, fast-moving musical. ... Not all the songs have wit and melodic grace... [the] book is smart and timely. ... Julie Harris moves Georgina as well as herself into a musical with commanding confidence."

Awards and nominations

Original Broadway production

References

External links
 Internet Broadway Database listing
 New York Public Library Blog on Skyscraper

1965 musicals
Broadway musicals
Musicals based on plays
Musicals by Peter Stone
Plays set in New York City